Decalepis arayalpathra is a species of plant in the family Apocynaceae. It is endemic to Peninsular India and known by its names of amirtha palaM in Tamil is a plant whose root is used in Ayurvedic medicines.

References

Periplocoideae